The 2017–18 Vermont Catamounts men's basketball team represented the University of Vermont during the 2017–18 NCAA Division I men's basketball season. The Catamounts, led by seventh-year head coach John Becker, played their home games at Patrick Gym in Burlington, Vermont as members of the America East Conference. They finished the season 27–8, 15–1 in America East play to win the America East regular season championship. The Catamounts defeated Maine and Stony Brook to advance to the championship game of the America East tournament where they lost to UMBC. As a regular season conference champion who failed to win their conference tournament, the Catamounts received an automatic bid to the National Invitation Tournament where they lost to Middle Tennessee in the first round.

Previous season
The Catamounts finished the 2016–17 season 29–6, 16–0 in America East play to win the America East regular season championship. In the America East tournament, they defeated Maine, New Hampshire, and Albany to win the tournament championship. As a result, they received the conference's automatic bid to the NCAA tournament. As the No. 13 seed in the Midwest region, they lost to No. 4 seed Purdue in the first round.

Offseason

Departures

2017 incoming recruits

Preseason 
In a poll by the conference’s nine head coaches (who were not allowed to pick their own team) at the America East media day, the Catamounts were picked to win the America East. Senior Trae Bell-Haynes and sophomore Anthony Lamb were named to the preseason All-America East team.

Roster

Schedule and results

|-
!colspan=12 style=| Exhibition

|-
!colspan=12 style=| Regular season

|-
!colspan=12 style=|America East tournament

|-
!colspan=12 style=|NIT

Source

References

Vermont Catamounts men's basketball seasons
Vermont
Vermont
Cat
Cat